Palmyra is a census-designated place (CDP) in Utah County, Utah, United States. It is part of the Provo–Orem Metropolitan Statistical Area. The population was 491 at the 2010 census. Palmyra is located directly west of Springville and northwest of Spanish Fork.

Palmyra was first settled in 1852.

History

Palmyra, located seven miles south of Provo, was founded on the Spanish Fork River in 1852. In March 1853, Stephen Markham was ordained a bishop and set apart to preside over the Palmyra LDS Ward. The town was eventually abandoned sometime in 1856, under the advice of Brigham Young. Most of the settlers located farther up the river, where the site of present-day Spanish Fork had been chosen and where a survey of a city had already been made. At the turn of the century, the area was resettled.

Geography

Demographics

As of the census of 2000, there were 485 people, 142 households, and 123 families residing in the CDP. The population density was 42.2 people per square mile (16.3/km2). There were 148 housing units at an average density of 12.9/sq mi (5.0/km2). The racial makeup of the CDP was 97.53% White, 0.21% Native American, 2.06% Asian, 0.21% from other races. Hispanic or Latino of any race were 3.71% of the population.

There were 142 households, out of which 40.8% had children under the age of 18 living with them, 80.3% were married couples living together, 4.2% had a female householder with no husband present, and 12.7% were non-families. 12.0% of all households were made up of individuals, and 4.2% had someone living alone who was 65 years of age or older. The average household size was 3.42 and the average family size was 3.72.

In the CDP, the population was spread out, with 34.0% under the age of 18, 10.1% from 18 to 24, 23.5% from 25 to 44, 21.6% from 45 to 64, and 10.7% who were 65 years of age or older. The median age was 31 years. For every 100 females, there were 119.5 males. For every 100 females age 18 and over, there were 114.8 males.

The median income for a household in the CDP was $58,750, and the median income for a family was $90,122. Males had a median income of $42,917 versus $24,531 for females. The per capita income for the CDP was $18,967. About 5.8% of families and 8.5% of the population were below the poverty line, including 17.0% of those under age 18 and none of those age 65 or over.

See also

 List of census-designated places in Utah

References

External links

Populated places established in 1852
Census-designated places in Utah County, Utah
Census-designated places in Utah
Provo–Orem metropolitan area
1852 establishments in Utah Territory